The Social Justice Coalition – also translated as the Social Justice Alliance – is a leftist electoral alliance in Egypt called for by the National Association for Change; it will compete in the 2015 Egyptian parliamentary election. The coalition has expanded to 27 different parties and movements. The Egyptian Communist Party, the Equality and Development Party and the Quiver Party left the alliance.

Affiliated parties 
 National Association for Change
 Nasserist People's Congress Party
 National Conciliation Party
 Knights of Egypt Party
 Revolution Egypt Party
 Liberal Socialist Party
 People Party
 Democratic Union Party
 Free Social Constitutional Party
 Egypt's Future Party
 Socialist Labour Party
 Revolutionary Rescue Party
 Egyptian National Council
 Greenpeace Movement
 Coalition of Egyptians Abroad
 National Youth Council
 Senior Nasserist Conference

References

2014 establishments in Egypt
Political party alliances in Egypt